Historias y testigos: ¡Ni una muerta más!* is a 2004 TV movie produced and televised by Florida's Telemundo. Part of the main cast returned for two sequels, each of one dealing with different unsolved cased.

 Spanish for "Stories & Witnesses: Not One More Death!"

Synopsis
Valentina Suarez (Fabiola Campomanes), a young and ambitious recently graduated reporter, has been just hired by an important TV Network. Even if her father (Patricio Castillo) is the CEO of the company, she's willing to be noted for her own merits. Her first assignment leads her to work with Diego Calderon (José Luis Franco), a war reporter who's recently returned from a traumatic experience in the Orient. Their first job together starts when Valentina receiveS the news that one of her best childhood friends, Manuela (Claudia Soberon), has been kidnapped, tortured and killed. They head to Juarez, a Mexican border-town, in order to investigate the woman's mysterious death. As they start the investigation, other two girls are also brutally murdered. With the collaboration of Melisa (Ludyvina Velarde), a computer genius and Pelon (Fabian Garza), Diego's assistant, Valentina and Diego face the mystery behind the unsolved murders of more than 300 women, which involves the corruption of Mexican Police and several other unknown facts . . .

Main cast
Fabiola Campomanes Valentina
Fabián Garza Diego
Ludyvina Velarde Melisa
Fabián Garza Pelón
Patricio Castillo Don Alejandro
Veronica de la Campa Nancy
Roberto Mateos Ernesto
Claudia Soberón Manuela

Epilogue
Soon after the successful release of Historias y testigos: ¡Ni una muerta más! in the United States, the Mexican TV network Azteca started pre-production for a similar product which was later entitled "Tan Infinito como el Desierto" (As Infinite as the Desert). While critically acclaimed, "Historias y testigos: ¡Ni una muerta más!" was appreciated for being an accurate dramatization based on real facts but with fictional characters, while TV Azteca's star-filled "Tan Infinito como el Desierto" was severely accused by Juarez' government for infaming the city of Juarez, since the teleplay was supposedly based on poor and false research and included the names of real-life people.

References

External links 

2004 television films
2004 films
2000s thriller films
2000s Spanish-language films
Mexican thriller films